Dasht-e Yahudi is a historic region referred to by Persian and early Mughal historians that comprises the most western parts of modern-day Peshawar, Charsadda, Malakand and Mardan districts, particularly around their border areas with the Khyber and Mohmand districts. While the region is not a desert, it does have a semi-arid climate.

The term was often employed by the Mughals in a derogatory sense with reference to the Pashtun tribes that inhabited the region (namely the Afridi, the Khattak, and the Yusufzai) and often waylaid Mughal caravans and contested trade routes. The term "Yahudi" was a reference to the alleged Jewish origin of the Pashtun people.

Despite successfully subjecting the majority of the Indian subcontinent to their rule, Mughal emperors were throughout their long dynasty unable to control the Pashtuns or strip them of their tribal autonomy.

In the present-day countries of Afghanistan and Pakistan, the term is obsolete.

Etymology

The term Dasht-e Yahudi literally translates to "Jewish Desert" in Urdu and "Jewish Wasteland" in Pashto. It is an archaic term that first appears in Persian and Mughal texts.

Dasht means 'desert' or 'field' in the Persian language. The same word is also used in Pashto and sometimes Urdu or Hindi, where it means both an arid area (waste) or a desert. However, the area recognized as Dasht-e Yahudi is not a desert, but used to be a semi-arid uncultivated area.

The so-called desert used to be barren and mountainous with sporadic dwellings and rare village settlements. In modern times, it has been extensively cultivated and for the most part is lush and green through canal systems and rivers.

Origin
In Persian and Mughal historical texts and rarely in Afghan texts, it is always found with another closely related term: Qilʽ Yahudiya or Qila Yahudi. The word "Qilʽ Yahudiya" literally translates to the "Jewish citadel/fort".

People and tribes 
Three major Pashtun tribes were settled in the area: the Afridi, the Yusufzai, and the Khattak.

The Afridi are settled in the western parts of the traditional region; the Yusufzai are settled on the eastern parts; and the Khattak in the central and northern parts. Additionally, the Mohmand tribe is also present in the northwest of the area. Both the Khattak and the Yusufzai were notorious for ransacking Mughal supply lines and trade routes, so much so that the Mughals had to build the Attock Fort to defend against it.

Ashoka's Aramaic stone edicts 

Ashoka's famous stone tablets and ancient edicts, some of which are found within the Dasht-e Yahudi regions of Shahbaz Garhi, Mardan, and Swabi, have inscriptions in the Greek and Aramaic languages.

Qilʽ Yahudiya 
Qilʽ Yahudiya, was an archaic term used by early Arab, Persian, and Mughal historians for the area that in modern-day Pakistan is located in the Khyber District and is simply known as Khyber. The word Khyber is now part of the name for the Pakistani province of Khyber Pakhtunkhwa and the Bab-e Khyber, the pass through which countless armies attacked India.

In its usage, the term thus stands for the Afridi tribesmen that held the Khyber Pass and the mountainous ranges known as the Sulaiman Mountains as well as the Hindu Kush.

See also
 Pashtunistan, a geographic region primarily in Afghanistan and Pakistan that is considered to be the traditional Pashtun homeland
 Pashtuns, an Iranian ethnic group native to Central and South Asia
 Theories of Pashtun origin, various legends and theories that aim to explain the origin of the Pashtun people
 Nimat Allah al-Harawi, a Mughal-era chronicler who compiled a Persian-language history of the Pashtuns

References

Footnotes

Hindu Kush
Historical regions
Cultural regions
Historical regions of Pakistan